Michael Casanova (born 4 May 1989) is a former Swiss footballer.

Career
He began his career with Team Ticino U-18 the youth team of Lugano and was in summer 2006 promoted to the first team. He played in the Lugano senior team his professional debut and joined the Challenge League team FC Locarno on 27 September 2008. In the summer 2009 two Super League teams, BSC Young Boys and FC Sion were interested in this player. In the summer of 2010, after a long and complicated process, he was transferred back to Lugano.

External links
 Swiss football league profile
 Swiss national under-20 team profile

1989 births
Sportspeople from Lugano
Living people
Swiss people of Italian descent
Swiss men's footballers
Switzerland youth international footballers
Association football goalkeepers
FC Locarno players
FC Lugano players
Swiss Challenge League players